Sudha Malhotra is an Indian playback singer. She also acted in some Bollywood films and as a playback singer, worked in popular Bollywood movies in the 1950s and 1960s, like Arzoo, Dhool Ka Phool, Ab Dilli Door Nahin, Girl Friend, Barsaat Ki Raat, Didi, Kala Pani, Prem Rog and Dekh Kabira Roya. She was last heard in Raj Kapoor's Prem Rog (1982) in the song "Yeh Pyar tha ya kuch aur tha". Apart from Hindi songs, Sudha sang many popular Marathi songs (Bhavgeet) with Arun Date.

She was awarded the Padma Shri by Government of India in 2013.

Early life and education
Sudha Malhotra was born in New Delhi and grew up in Lahore, Bhopal and Firozpur. She is the eldest of 4 siblings - Arun, Vijay, Kiran and herself. She did her graduation in music from Agra University.

Career
Malhotra was discovered as a child artist by Ghulam Haider (a prominent music director of the 1940s).  She debuted in the movie Arzoo. She retired from film industry in 1960, following her marriage with businessman Giridhar Motwani (whose family owned the Chicago Radio Mike Company). She recorded for a few albums in the following years, including for Jagjit Singh's In a Mood of Love. She also sang for Raj Kapoor's Prem Rog in 1982.

Some of her popular Marathi songs are (Bhavgeet) - "Shukratara Mandwara", "Haat Tuza Haataat" and "Divas Tujhe he Fulayche", all duets with Arun Date. She has sung 264 songs in 155 films.

Personal life
Sudha Malhotra married Giridhar Motwani, whose family owned the famed Chicago Radio.  After her marriage, photographs of her with the celebrated lyricist Sahir Ludhianvi were published in the Blitz magazine. She repeatedly denied their relationship, and later, Blitz released an apology. It is believed that Ludhianvi wrote the song Chalo Ek Baar Phir Se when Sudha’s marriage was finalised.

Filmography
 Arzoo
 Ab Dilli Door Nahin
 Girl Friend
 Dekh Kabira Roya (1957)
 Dhool Ka Phool (1959)
 Barsaat Ki Raat (1960)
 Gauhar
 Dil-e-Naadan (1953)
 Babar
 Didi
 Prem Rog (1982)

References

External links
 
 Sudha Malhotra Discography

Bollywood playback singers
Living people
People from Delhi
Actresses in Hindi cinema
Recipients of the Padma Shri in arts
Indian women playback singers
20th-century Indian singers
Punjabi people
20th-century Indian women singers
Singers from Punjab, India
Dr. Bhimrao Ambedkar University alumni
Year of birth missing (living people)